All Samples Cleared! is the fourth studio album by rapper Biz Markie. Produced by Biz Markie and his cousin Cool V, it was released on June 22, 1993, and was Biz Markie's final studio album released by Cold Chillin'/Warner Bros. Records. The title references a court battle over a sample Markie used on his 1991 song "Alone Again".

The album peaked at #43 on the Top R&B/Hip-Hop Albums, though the single "Let Me Turn You On" made it to #7 on the Hot Rap Singles. It was Markie's last studio album until 2003's Weekend Warrior.

Track listing
"I'm the Biz Markie" – 4:08 
"I'm a Ugly Nigga (So What)" – 4:57 
"Young Girl Bluez" – 4:08 
"Family Tree" – 2:18 
"Let Me Turn You On" – 5:34 
"The Gator (Dance)" – 4:03 
"Groovin'" – 5:18 
"I'm Singin'" – 5:12 
"Hooker Got a Boyfriend" – 4:47 
"Bad by Myself" – 5:07 
"Funk Is Back" – 3:43 
"Thanks" – 5:21

Charts

References

1993 albums
Biz Markie albums
Cold Chillin' Records albums
Albums produced by Biz Markie